Paranormal is the twentieth solo and twenty-seventh overall studio album by American rock musician Alice Cooper, released on July 28, 2017. It features three tracks performed by the "classic" line-up of the Alice Cooper band (Neal Smith, Dennis Dunaway, and Michael Bruce, sans Glen Buxton, who died in 1997) plus Larry Mullen Jr. from U2, Roger Glover from Deep Purple, Billy Gibbons from ZZ Top, Swedish songwriter and session guitarist Tommy Denander, Alice Cooper bandmate Tommy Henriksen, Steve Hunter. "Holy Water" is a cover of the Villebillies song.

Track listing

Personnel

Studio album
Alice Cooper – vocals (all tracks), backing vocals (track 7)
Tommy Denander – guitar (all tracks), co producer
Tommy Henriksen – guitar (all tracks), backing vocals (all tracks), percussion (tracks 4, 6, and 9), sound effects (track 4, 6, 9, and 10), keyboards (track 9), co producer
Larry Mullen Jr. – drums (tracks 1–8, and 10)
Bob Ezrin – production, keyboards (tracks 1 and 9), organ (tracks 3 and 10), sound effects (tracks 4), backing vocals (track 7)
Roger Glover – bass (track 1)
Billy Gibbons – guitar (track 5)
Jimmy Lee Sloas – bass (tracks 2, and 4–8)
Dennis Dunaway – bass (tracks 3, 9 and 10)
Parker Gispert – guitar (track 7), backing vocals (track 7)
Steve Hunter – lead guitar (track 8, 11 and 12)
Demi Demaree – backing vocals (tracks 8 and 10)
Johnny Reid – backing vocals (tracks 8 and 10)
Jeremy Rubolino – horns (track 8)
Adrian Olmos – horns (track 8)
Chris Traynor – horns (tracks 8)
Michael Bruce – guitar (track 9)
Neal Smith – drums (track 9)
Nick Didkovsky – guitar (tracks 3 and 10)

Bonus tracks with original members
Michael Bruce – guitar (both tracks)
Neal Smith – drums (both tracks)
Dennis Dunaway – bass (both tracks)
Steve Hunter – guitar (track 11), lead guitar (track 12)
Bob Ezrin – keyboards (track 11), backing vocals (track 11)
Tommy Denander – guitar (both tracks)
Nick Didkovsky – guitar (track 12)
Tommy Henriksen – backing vocals (track 12)

Bonus tracks live in Columbus
Chuck Garric – bass, backing vocals
Nita Strauss – guitar, backing vocals
Glen Sobel – drums
Tommy Henriksen – guitar, backing vocals
Ryan Roxie – guitar, backing vocals

Charts

References

2017 albums
Alice Cooper albums
Concept albums
Albums produced by Bob Ezrin